The Payoff is a 1935 American dramatic film directed by Robert Florey. James Dunn stars as a newspaper reporter promoted to the sports desk, but saddled with a wife whose spending habits drive her into a relationship with a blackmailing racketeer.

Cast
 James Dunn as Joe McCoy
 Claire Dodd as Maxine McCoy
 Patricia Ellis as Connie Travers
 Alan Dinehart as Marty Bleuler
 Joseph Crehan as Harvey Morris
 Frankie Darro as Jimmy Moore
 Frank Sheridan as George Gorman
 Al Hill as Mike
 Paul Porcasi as Nick
 George Chandler as Reporter

External links 
 
 

1935 films
Warner Bros. films
Films directed by Robert Florey
1935 romantic drama films
American romantic drama films
Films about journalists
American black-and-white films
1930s American films